The Stream is a 1922 German silent film directed by Felix Basch and starring Hermann Thimig and Eduard von Winterstein.

The film's sets were designed by the art director Robert Neppach.

Cast

References

Bibliography

External links

1922 films
Films of the Weimar Republic
Films directed by Felix Basch
German silent feature films
German black-and-white films
UFA GmbH films